Tom Slick is the cartoon star of a series of shorts that aired within the half-hour  animated television series George of the Jungle (ABC, 1967). It was the work of Jay Ward Productions, the creators of Rocky & Bullwinkle and other satiric animated characters. Seventeen six-minute episodes were made.

The premise
Freckled, grinning, all-American racecar driver Tom Slick (voiced by Bill Scott) competes in various races with his trusty vehicle, the Thunderbolt Grease-Slapper.  He is accompanied by his girlfriend Marigold (voiced by June Foray) and his elderly mechanic Gertie Growler (also voiced by Bill Scott). The two women do not always get along well. A recurring antagonist is the evil Baron Otto Matic (voiced by Paul Frees), and the Baron's stupid lackey Clutcher (voiced by Daws Butler impersonating Frank Fontaine as "Crazy Guggenheim"  ), whom the Baron has a penchant for hitting across the head with a monkey wrench.

A running gag throughout the series is that the Thunderbolt Grease-Slapper can be converted into virtually any type of racing vehicle, often looking nothing like the original vehicle itself.  Various episodes show the Grease-Slapper as a train, stock car racer, drag racer, racing balloon, swamp buggy, submarine, even a miniaturized skateboard.

As the theme song is sung, Tom's Thunderbolt Grease-Slapper suddenly "hops" out of control off a road and into a barnyard occupied by farm animals. Tom is knocked momentarily unconscious with a chicken sitting on top of his head as he drives straight into a brick wall. But he miraculously gets out of the sudden pandemonium as his car falls apart in mid-air and suddenly falls back together again. The car then jumps onto (and off) a stone monument bearing Tom Slick's name and gets back on the road as Tom waves his hand and smiles.

The theme song's lyrics are as follows:
 Tom Slick
 Tom Slick
 Let me tell you why 
 He’s the best of all good guys
 Tom Slick
 Tom Slick
 In the Thunderbolt Grease-Slapper, once he’s on your tail,
 He won’t quit because you know there’s no such word as "fail" to
 Tom Slick
 Tom Slick!

Tom Slick in the comics
In comic books, Tom Slick appeared as a backup feature in Gold Key Comics's two-issue George of the Jungle title (1969).

Episodes

List of Tom Slick episode titles and dates

See also
 Penelope Pitstop
 Roger Ramjet
 Speed Racer

References

External links
 Don Markstein's Toonopedia: Tom Slick
 Frostbite Falls Page: Tom Slick, Racer

George of the Jungle
Fictional racing drivers
1967 American television series debuts
1967 American television series endings
1960s American animated television series
American children's animated comedy television series
American children's animated sports television series
Animated television series about auto racing